Zoe Lucas (born 2 May 1992) is an English professional wrestler best known by the ring name Zoe Lucas. She is best known for her work on the independent circuit with various promotions including in Rise Wrestling, Shimmer Women Athletes, World Wonder Ring Stardom, Pro-Wrestling: EVE, Revolution Pro Wrestling (RevPro) where is the former RevPro British Women's Champion.

Professional wrestling career

She debuted in 2015 with an English group.

She first visited to Japan in February 2017, to participate in Stardom and then a second visit to Japan in May 2018.

She made a third visit to Japan in June 2019. After joining STARS, she turned to TOKYO CYBER SQUAD led by Hana Kimura in the first match.

At the Nagoya Games on 15 July, Lucas challenged the Artist of Stardom Championship held by Mayu Iwatani, Saki Kashima, and Tam Nakano who also participated Tokyo Cyber Squad (Hana Kimura, Bobby Tyler), but they did not win the title.

In 2019, she is competing in Stardom in Japan, RPW in the UK, professional wrestling EVE. RISE Wrestling in the US, SHIMMER, etc.

Championships and accomplishments
 Ironfist Wrestling
 Ironfist Women's Championship (1 time)
 Pro Wrestling Illustrated
 Ranked No. 79 of the top 100 female singles wrestlers in the PWI Women's 100 in 2020
 Revolution Pro Wrestling
 RevPro British Women's Championship (1 time)
 Rise Wrestling
 Phoenix of RISE Championship (1 time)

References

External links
 
 
 

1992 births
English expatriates in Japan
English female professional wrestlers
Expatriate professional wrestlers in Japan
Living people
Sportspeople from Portsmouth
21st-century professional wrestlers
Undisputed British Women's Champions